This is a list of the bird species recorded in Western Sahara. The avifauna of Western Sahara include a total of 355 species.

This list's taxonomic treatment (designation and sequence of orders, families and species) and nomenclature (common and scientific names) follow the conventions of The Clements Checklist of Birds of the World, 2022 edition. The family accounts at the beginning of each heading reflect this taxonomy, as do the species counts found in each family account. Accidental species are included in the total species count for Western Sahara.

The following tags have been used to highlight several categories. The commonly occurring native species do not fall into any of these categories.

(A) Accidental - a species that rarely or accidentally occurs in Western Sahara

Ostriches
Order: StruthioniformesFamily: Struthionidae

The ostrich is a flightless bird native to Africa. It is the largest living species of bird. It is distinctive in its appearance, with a long neck and legs and the ability to run at high speeds.

Common ostrich, Struthio camelus

Ducks, geese, and waterfowl
Order: AnseriformesFamily: Anatidae

Anatidae includes the ducks and most duck-like waterfowl, such as geese and swans. These birds are adapted to an aquatic existence with webbed feet, flattened bills, and feathers that are excellent at shedding water due to an oily coating.

Graylag goose, Anser anser (A)
Greater white-fronted goose, Anser albifrons (A)
Brant, Branta bernicla (A)
Ruddy shelduck, Tadorna ferruginea
Common shelduck, Tadorna tadorna (A)
Garganey, Spatula querquedula
Northern shoveler, Spatula clypeata
Gadwall, Mareca strepera (A)
Eurasian wigeon, Mareca penelope
Mallard, Anas platyrhynchos
Northern pintail, Anas acuta
Green-winged teal, Anas crecca
Marbled teal, Marmaronetta angustirostris
Red-crested pochard, Netta rufina (A)
Common pochard, Aythya ferina
Ring-necked duck, Aythya collaris (A)
Ferruginous duck, Aythya nyroca (A)
Tufted duck, Aythya fuligula (A)
Greater scaup, Aythya marila (A)
Lesser scaup, Aythya affinis (A)
Common scoter, Melanitta nigra (A)
Ruddy duck, Oxyura jamaicensis (A)

Pheasants, grouse, and allies
Order: GalliformesFamily: Phasianidae

The Phasianidae are a family of terrestrial birds which consists of quails, partridges, snowcocks, francolins, spurfowls, tragopans, monals, pheasants, peafowls and jungle fowls. In general, they are plump (although they vary in size) and have broad, relatively short wings. 

Common quail, Coturnix coturnix
Barbary partridge, Alectoris barbara

Flamingos
Order: PhoenicopteriformesFamily: Phoenicopteridae

Flamingos filter-feed on shellfish and algae. Their oddly shaped beaks are specially adapted to separate mud and silt from the food they consume and, uniquely, are used upside-down. There are 6 species worldwide and 1 species which occurs in Western Sahara.

Greater flamingo, Phoenicopterus roseus
Lesser flamingo, Phoenicopterus minor (A)

Grebes
Order: PodicipediformesFamily: Podicipedidae

Grebes are small to medium-large freshwater diving birds. They have lobed toes and are excellent swimmers and divers. However, they have their feet placed far back on the body, making them quite ungainly on land.

Little grebe, Tachybaptus ruficollis
Great crested grebe, Podiceps cristatus
Eared grebe, Tachybaptus nigricollis

Pigeons and doves
Order: ColumbiformesFamily: Columbidae

Pigeons and doves are stout-bodied birds with short necks and short slender bills with a fleshy cere. There are 308 species worldwide and 4 species which occur in Western Sahara.

Rock pigeon, Columba livia
Common wood-pigeon, Columba palumbus
European turtle-dove, Streptopelia turtur
Eurasian collared-dove, Streptopelia decaocto
Laughing dove, Streptopelia senegalensis
Namaqua dove, Oena capensis (A)

Sandgrouse
Order: PterocliformesFamily: Pteroclidae

Sandgrouse have small, pigeon like heads and necks, but sturdy compact bodies. They have long pointed wings and sometimes tails and a fast direct flight. Their legs are feathered down to the toes. Flocks fly to watering holes at dawn and dusk. Travelling as far as fifty miles daily to get to water and bathe. The adult male will carry water back to its young in its thickly feathered breast. At the nest, the young take the water from the parent's feathers with their beaks.

Pin-tailed sandgrouse, Pterocles alchata
Spotted sandgrouse, Pterocles senegallus
Black-bellied sandgrouse, Pterocles orientalis
Crowned sandgrouse, Pterocles coronatus

Bustards
Order: OtidiformesFamily: Otididae

Bustards are large terrestrial birds mainly associated with dry open country and steppes in the Old World. They are omnivorous and nest on the ground. They walk steadily on strong legs and big toes, pecking for food as they go. They have long broad wings with "fingered" wingtips and striking patterns in flight. Many have interesting mating displays. 

Arabian bustard, Ardeotis arabs (A)
Houbara bustard, Chlamydotis undulata

Cuckoos
Order: CuculiformesFamily: Cuculidae

The family Cuculidae includes cuckoos, roadrunners and anis. These birds are of variable size with slender bodies, long tails and strong legs. The Old World cuckoos are brood parasites. 

Great spotted cuckoo, Clamator glandarius
Common cuckoo, Cuculus canorus

Nightjars and allies
Order: CaprimulgiformesFamily: Caprimulgidae

Nightjars are medium-sized nocturnal birds that usually nest on the ground. They have long wings, short legs and very short bills. Most have small feet, of little use for walking, and long pointed wings. Their soft plumage is camouflaged to resemble bark or leaves.

Red-necked nightjar, Caprimulgus ruficollis
Eurasian nightjar, Caprimulgus europaeus
Egyptian nightjar, Caprimulgus aegyptius (A)
Golden nightjar, Caprimulgus eximius (A)

Swifts
Order: CaprimulgiformesFamily: Apodidae

Swifts are small birds which spend the majority of their lives flying. These birds have very short legs and never settle voluntarily on the ground, perching instead only on vertical surfaces. Many swifts have long swept-back wings which resemble a crescent or boomerang. 

Common swift, Apus apus
Plain swift, Apus unicolor (A)
Pallid swift, Apus pallidus
Little swift, Apus affinis

Rails, gallinules, and coots
Order: GruiformesFamily: Rallidae

Rallidae is a large family of small to medium-sized birds which includes the rails, crakes, coots and gallinules. Typically they inhabit dense vegetation in damp environments near lakes, swamps or rivers. In general they are shy and secretive birds, making them difficult to observe. Most species have strong legs and long toes which are well adapted to soft uneven surfaces. They tend to have short, rounded wings and to be weak fliers. 

Water rail, Rallus aquaticus
Corn crake, Crex crex
African crake, Crex egregia (A)
Spotted crake, Porzana porzana
Eurasian moorhen, Gallinula chloropus
Eurasian coot, Fulica atra
Red-knobbed coot, Fulica cristata (A)
Allen's gallinule, Porphyrio alleni (A)
Little crake, Zapornia parva
Baillon's crake, Zapornia pusilla

Cranes
Order: GruiformesFamily: Gruidae

Cranes are large, long-legged and long-necked birds. Unlike the similar-looking but unrelated herons, cranes fly with necks outstretched, not pulled back. Most have elaborate and noisy courting displays or "dances".

Common crane, Grus grus (A)

Thick-knees
Order: CharadriiformesFamily: Burhinidae

The thick-knees are a group of largely tropical waders in the family Burhinidae. They are found worldwide within the tropical zone, with some species also breeding in temperate Europe and Australia. They are medium to large waders with strong black or yellow-black bills, large yellow eyes and cryptic plumage. Despite being classed as waders, most species have a preference for arid or semi-arid habitats.

Eurasian thick-knee, Burhinus oedicnemus

Stilts and avocets
Order: CharadriiformesFamily: Recurvirostridae

Recurvirostridae is a family of large wading birds, which includes the avocets and stilts. The avocets have long legs and long up-curved bills. The stilts have extremely long legs and long, thin, straight bills. 

Black-winged stilt, Himantopus himantopus
Pied avocet, Recurvirostra avosetta

Oystercatchers
Order: CharadriiformesFamily: Haematopodidae

The oystercatchers are large and noisy plover-like birds, with strong bills used for smashing or prising open molluscs. 

Eurasian oystercatcher, Haematopus ostralegus

Plovers and lapwings
Order: CharadriiformesFamily: Charadriidae

The family Charadriidae includes the plovers, dotterels and lapwings. They are small to medium-sized birds with compact bodies, short, thick necks and long, usually pointed, wings. They are found in open country worldwide, mostly in habitats near water. 

Black-bellied plover, Pluvialis squatarola
European golden-plover, Pluvialis apricaria
Northern lapwing, Vanellus vanellus
Kentish plover, Charadrius alexandrinus
Common ringed plover, Charadrius hiaticula
Little ringed plover, Charadrius dubius
Eurasian dotterel, Charadrius morinellus (A)

Sandpipers and allies
Order: CharadriiformesFamily: Scolopacidae

Scolopacidae is a large diverse family of small to medium-sized shorebirds including the sandpipers, curlews, godwits, shanks, tattlers, woodcocks, snipes, dowitchers and phalaropes. The majority of these species eat small invertebrates picked out of the mud or soil. Variation in length of legs and bills enables multiple species to feed in the same habitat, particularly on the coast, without direct competition for food. 

Upland sandpiper, Bartramia longicauda (A)
Whimbrel, Numenius phaeopus
Slender-billed curlew, Numenius tenuirostris (A)
Eurasian curlew, Numenius arquata
Bar-tailed godwit, Limosa lapponica
Black-tailed godwit, Limosa limosa
Ruddy turnstone, Arenaria interpres
Red knot, Calidris canutus
Ruff, Calidris pugnax
Broad-billed sandpiper, Calidris falcinellus (A)
Curlew sandpiper, Calidris ferruginea
Temminck's stint, Calidris temminckii
Sanderling, Calidris alba
Dunlin, Calidris alpina
Little stint, Calidris minuta
Long-billed dowitcher, Limnodromus scolopaceus (A)
Jack snipe, Lymnocryptes minimus
Common snipe, Gallinago gallinago
Wilson's phalarope, Phalaropus tricolor (A)
Red-necked phalarope, Phalaropus lobatus (A)
Red phalarope, Phalaropus fulicarius
Common sandpiper, Actitis hypoleucos
Spotted sandpiper, Actitis macularius (A)
Green sandpiper, Tringa ochropus
Spotted redshank, Tringa erythropus
Common greenshank, Tringa nebularia
Marsh sandpiper, Tringa stagnatilis
Wood sandpiper, Tringa glareola
Common redshank, Tringa totanus

Pratincoles and coursers
Order: CharadriiformesFamily: Glareolidae

Glareolidae is a family of wading birds comprising the pratincoles, which have short legs, long pointed wings and long forked tails, and the coursers, which have long legs, short wings and long, pointed bills which curve downwards.

Cream-colored courser, Cursorius cursor
Collared pratincole, Glareola pratincola

Skuas and jaegers
Order: CharadriiformesFamily: Stercorariidae

The family Stercorariidae are, in general, medium to large birds, typically with grey or brown plumage, often with white markings on the wings. They nest on the ground in temperate and arctic regions and are long-distance migrants. 

Great skua, Stercorarius skua
Pomarine jaeger, Stercorarius pomarinus
Parasitic jaeger, Stercorarius parasiticus
Long-tailed jaeger, Stercorarius longicaudus (A)

Auks, murres, and puffins
Order: CharadriiformesFamily: Alcidae

Alcids are superficially similar to penguins due to their black-and-white colours, their upright posture and some of their habits, however they are not related to the penguins and differ in being able to fly. Auks live on the open sea, only deliberately coming ashore to nest.

Common murre, Uria aalge (A)
Razorbill, Alca torda (A)
Atlantic puffin, Fratercula arctica (A)

Gulls, terns, and skimmers
Order: CharadriiformesFamily: Laridae

Laridae is a family of medium to large seabirds, the gulls, terns, and skimmers. Gulls are typically grey or white, often with black markings on the head or wings. They have stout, longish bills and webbed feet. Terns are a group of generally medium to large seabirds typically with grey or white plumage, often with black markings on the head. Most terns hunt fish by diving but some pick insects off the surface of fresh water. Terns are generally long-lived birds, with several species known to live in excess of 30 years.

Black-legged kittiwake, Rissa tridactyla
Sabine's gull, Xema sabini
Slender-billed gull, Chroicocephalus genei
Bonaparte's gull, Chroicocephalus philadelphia (A)
Gray-hooded gull, Chroicocephalus cirrocephalus (A)
Black-headed gull, Chroicocephalus ridibundus
Little gull, Hydrocoloeus minutus
Laughing gull, Leucophaeus atricilla (A)
Franklin's gull, Leucophaeus pipixcan (A)
Mediterranean gull, Ichthyaetus melanocephalus
Pallas's gull, Ichthyaetus ichthyaetus (A)
Audouin's gull, Ichthyaetus audouinii
Common gull, Larus canus (A)
Ring-billed gull, Larus delawarensis (A)
Herring gull, Larus argentatus (A)
Yellow-legged gull, Larus michahellis
Lesser black-backed gull, Larus fuscus
Great black-backed gull, Larus marinus (A)
Kelp gull, Larus dominicanus (A)
Sooty tern, Onychoprion fuscatus (A)
Bridled tern, Onychoprion anaethetus
Little tern, Sternula albifrons
Gull-billed tern, Gelochelidon nilotica
Caspian tern, Hydroprogne caspia
Black tern, Chlidonias niger
White-winged tern, Chlidonias leucopterus
Whiskered tern, Chlidonias hybrida
Roseate tern, Sterna dougallii
Common tern, Sterna hirundo
Arctic tern, Sterna paradisaea
Sandwich tern, Thalasseus sandvicensis
Lesser crested tern, Thalasseus bengalensis
West African crested tern, Thalasseus albididorsalis

Tropicbirds
Order: PhaethontiformesFamily: Phaethontidae

Tropicbirds are slender white birds of tropical oceans, with exceptionally long central tail feathers. Their heads and long wings have black markings.

Red-billed tropicbird, Phaethon aethereus (A)

Loons
Order: GaviiformesFamily: Gaviidae

Loons, known as divers in Europe, are a group of aquatic birds found in many parts of North America and northern Europe. They are the size of a large duck or small goose, which they somewhat resemble when swimming, but to which they are completely unrelated. 

Common loon, Gavia immer (A)

Southern storm-petrels
Order: ProcellariiformesFamily: Oceanitidae

The southern storm-petrels are relatives of the petrels and are the smallest seabirds. They feed on planktonic crustaceans and small fish picked from the surface, typically while hovering. The flight is fluttering and sometimes bat-like.

Wilson's storm-petrel, Oceanites oceanicus
White-faced storm-petrel, Pelagodroma marina (A)

Northern storm-petrels
Order: ProcellariiformesFamily: Hydrobatidae

The northern storm-petrels are relatives of the petrels and are the smallest seabirds. They feed on planktonic crustaceans and small fish picked from the surface, typically while hovering. The flight is fluttering and sometimes bat-like.

European storm-petrel, Hydrobates pelagicus
Leach's storm-petrel, Hydrobates leucorhous
Band-rumped storm-petrel, Hydrobates castro (A)

Shearwaters and petrels
Order: ProcellariiformesFamily: Procellariidae

The procellariids are the main group of medium-sized "true petrels", characterised by united nostrils with medium septum and a long outer functional primary.

Zino's petrel, Pterodroma madeira
Fea's petrel, Pterodroma feae
Bulwer's petrel, Bulweria bulwerii
Cory's shearwater, Calonectris diomedea
Cape Verde shearwater, Calonectris edwardsii
Great shearwater, Ardenna gravis
Sooty shearwater, Ardenna grisea
Manx shearwater, Puffinus puffinus (A)
Balearic shearwater, Puffinus mauretanicus
Barolo shearwater, Puffinus baroli
Persian shearwater, Puffinus persicus

Storks
Order: CiconiiformesFamily: Ciconiidae

Storks are large, long-legged, long-necked, wading birds with long, stout bills. Storks are mute, but bill-clattering is an important mode of communication at the nest. Their nests can be large and may be reused for many years. Many species are migratory.

Black stork, Ciconia nigra
White stork, Ciconia ciconia
Yellow-billed stork, Mycteria ibis

Boobies and gannets
Order: SuliformesFamily: Sulidae

The sulids comprise the gannets and boobies. Both groups are medium to large coastal seabirds that plunge-dive for fish.

Masked booby, Sula dactylatra (A)
Northern gannet, Morus bassanus

Cormorants and shags
Order: SuliformesFamily: Phalacrocoracidae

Phalacrocoracidae is a family of medium to large coastal, fish-eating seabirds that includes cormorants and shags. Plumage colouration varies, with the majority having mainly dark plumage, some species being black-and-white and a few being colourful.

Long-tailed cormorant, Microcarbo africanus (A)
Great cormorant, Phalacrocorax carbo
European shag, Gulosus aristotelis

Pelicans
Order: PelecaniformesFamily: Pelecanidae

Pelicans are large water birds with a distinctive pouch under their beak. As with other members of the order Pelecaniformes, they have webbed feet with four toes.

Great white pelican, Pelecanus onocrotalus (A)

Bitterns, herons, and egrets
Order: PelecaniformesFamily: Ardeidae

The family Ardeidae contains the bitterns, herons and egrets. Herons and egrets are medium to large wading birds with long necks and legs. Bitterns tend to be shorter necked and more wary. Members of Ardeidae fly with their necks retracted, unlike other long-necked birds such as storks, ibises and spoonbills.

Great bittern, Botaurus stellaris (A)
Little bittern, Ixobrychus minutus
Gray heron, Ardea cinerea
Purple heron, Ardea purpurea
Great egret, Ardea alba (A)
Little egret, Egretta garzetta
Western reef-heron, Egretta gularis (A)
Cattle egret, Bubulcus ibis
Squacco heron, Ardeola ralloides
Black-crowned night-heron, Nycticorax nycticorax

Ibises and spoonbills
Order: PelecaniformesFamily: Threskiornithidae

Threskiornithidae is a family of large terrestrial and wading birds which includes the ibises and spoonbills. They have long, broad wings with 11 primary and about 20 secondary feathers. They are strong fliers and despite their size and weight, very capable soarers.

Glossy ibis, Plegadis falcinellus
Northern bald ibis, Geronticus eremita
Eurasian spoonbill, Platalea leucorodia

Osprey
Order: AccipitriformesFamily: Pandionidae

The family Pandionidae contains only one species, the osprey. The osprey is a medium-large raptor which is a specialist fish-eater with a worldwide distribution.

Osprey, Pandion haliaetus

Hawks, eagles, and kites 
Order: AccipitriformesFamily: Accipitridae

Accipitridae is a family of birds of prey, which includes hawks, eagles, kites, harriers and Old World vultures. These birds have powerful hooked beaks for tearing flesh from their prey, strong legs, powerful talons and keen eyesight.

Black-winged kite, Elanus caeruleus
Bearded vulture, Gypaetus barbatus
Egyptian vulture, Neophron percnopterus
European honey-buzzard, Pernis apivorus
Lappet-faced vulture, Torgos tracheliotos (A)
Rüppell's griffon, Gyps rueppelli (A)
Eurasian griffon, Gyps fulvus
Short-toed snake-eagle, Circaetus gallicus
Booted eagle, Hieraaetus pennatus
Tawny eagle, Aquila rapax
Steppe eagle, Aquila nipalensis (A)
Spanish eagle, Aquila adalberti (A)
Golden eagle, Aquila chrysaetos
Bonelli's eagle, Aquila fasciata
Dark chanting-goshawk, Melierax metabates (A)
Eurasian marsh-harrier, Circus aeruginosus
Hen harrier, Circus cyaneus
Pallid harrier, Circus macrourus (A)
Montagu's harrier, Circus pygargus
Eurasian sparrowhawk, Accipiter nisus
Red kite, Milvus milvus
Black kite, Milvus migrans
Common buzzard, Buteo buteo
Long-legged buzzard, Buteo rufinus

Barn-owls
Order: StrigiformesFamily: Tytonidae

Barn-owls are medium to large owls with large heads and characteristic heart-shaped faces. They have long strong legs with powerful talons. 

Barn owl, Tyto alba

Owls
Order: StrigiformesFamily: Strigidae

The typical owls are small to large solitary nocturnal birds of prey. They have large forward-facing eyes and ears, a hawk-like beak and a conspicuous circle of feathers around each eye called a facial disk.

Eurasian scops-owl, Otus scops
Pharaoh eagle-owl, Bubo ascalaphus
Little owl, Athene noctua
Long-eared owl, Asio otus (A)
Short-eared owl, Asio flammeus

Hoopoes
Order: BucerotiformesFamily: Upupidae

Hoopoes have black, white and orangey-pink colouring with a large erectile crest on their head. 

Eurasian hoopoe, Upupa epops

Kingfishers
Order: CoraciiformesFamily: Alcedinidae

Kingfishers are medium-sized birds with large heads, long, pointed bills, short legs and stubby tails.

Common kingfisher, Alcedo atthis

Bee-eaters
Order: CoraciiformesFamily: Meropidae

The bee-eaters are a group of near passerine birds in the family Meropidae. Most species are found in Africa but others occur in southern Europe, Madagascar, Australia and New Guinea. They are characterised by richly coloured plumage, slender bodies and usually elongated central tail feathers. All are colourful and have long downturned bills and pointed wings, which give them a swallow-like appearance when seen from afar.

White-throated bee-eater, Merops albicollis (A)
Blue-cheeked bee-eater, Merops persicus (A)
European bee-eater, Merops apiaster

Rollers
Order: CoraciiformesFamily: Coraciidae

Rollers resemble crows in size and build, but are more closely related to the kingfishers and bee-eaters. They share the colourful appearance of those groups with blues and browns predominating. The two inner front toes are connected, but the outer toe is not. 

European roller, Coracias garrulus

Woodpeckers
Order: PiciformesFamily: Picidae

Woodpeckers are small to medium-sized birds with chisel-like beaks, short legs, stiff tails and long tongues used for capturing insects. Some species have feet with two toes pointing forward and two backward, while several species have only three toes. Many woodpeckers have the habit of tapping noisily on tree trunks with their beaks. 

Eurasian wryneck, Jynx torquilla

Falcons and caracaras
Order: FalconiformesFamily: Falconidae

Falconidae is a family of diurnal birds of prey. They differ from hawks, eagles and kites in that they kill with their beaks instead of their talons. 

Lesser kestrel, Falco naumanni
Eurasian kestrel, Falco tinnunculus
Red-footed falcon, Falco vespertinus (A)
Eleonora's falcon, Falco eleonorae
Lanner falcon, Falco biarmicus
Saker falcon, Falco cherrug (A)
Peregrine falcon, Falco peregrinus

Old World orioles
Order: PasseriformesFamily: Oriolidae

The Old World orioles are colourful passerine birds. They are not related to the New World orioles. 

Eurasian golden oriole, Oriolus oriolus

Bushshrikes and allies
Order: PasseriformesFamily: Malaconotidae

Bushshrikes are similar in habits to shrikes, hunting insects and other small prey from a perch on a bush. Although similar in build to the shrikes, these tend to be either colourful species or largely black; some species are quite secretive.

Black-crowned tchagra, Tchagra senegalus

Shrikes
Order: PasseriformesFamily: Laniidae

Shrikes are passerine birds known for their habit of catching other birds and small animals and impaling the uneaten portions of their bodies on thorns. A typical shrike's beak is hooked, like a bird of prey.

Great gray shrike, Lanius excubitor
Woodchat shrike, Lanius senator

Crows, jays, and magpies
Order: PasseriformesFamily: Corvidae

The family Corvidae includes crows, ravens, jays, choughs, magpies, treepies, nutcrackers and ground jays. Corvids are above average in size among the Passeriformes, and some of the larger species show high levels of intelligence.

Maghreb magpie, Pica mauritanica
Eurasian magpie, Pica pica
Pied crow, Corvus albus (A) 
Brown-necked raven, Corvus ruficollis
Common raven, Corvus corax

Tits, chickadees, and titmice
Order: PasseriformesFamily: Paridae

The Paridae are mainly small stocky woodland species with short stout bills. Some have crests. They are adaptable birds, with a mixed diet including seeds and insects.

African blue tit, Cyanistes teneriffae
Great tit, Parus major

Larks

Order: PasseriformesFamily: Alaudidae

Larks are small terrestrial birds with often extravagant songs and display flights. Most larks are fairly dull in appearance. Their food is insects and seeds. 

Greater hoopoe-lark, Alaemon alaudipes
Thick-billed lark, Ramphocoris clotbey
Bar-tailed lark, Ammomanes cincturus
Desert lark, Ammomanes deserti
Black-crowned sparrow-lark, Eremopterix nigriceps
Temminck's lark, Eremophila bilopha
Greater short-toed lark, Calandrella brachydactyla
Calandra lark, Melanocorypha calandra
Dunn's lark, Eremalauda dunni
Mediterranean short-toed lark, Alaudala rufescens
Eurasian skylark, Alauda arvensis
Thekla's lark, Galerida theklae
Crested lark, Galerida cristata

Cisticolas and allies
Order: PasseriformesFamily: Cisticolidae

The Cisticolidae are warblers found mainly in warmer southern regions of the Old World. They are generally very small birds of drab brown or grey appearance found in open country such as grassland or scrub.

Cricket longtail, Spiloptila clamans
Zitting cisticola, Cisticola juncidis

Reed warblers and allies
Order: PasseriformesFamily: Acrocephalidae

The members of this family are usually rather large for "warblers". Most are rather plain olivaceous brown above with much yellow to beige below. They are usually found in open woodland, reedbeds, or tall grass. The family occurs mostly in southern to western Eurasia and surroundings, but it also ranges far into the Pacific, with some species in Africa.

Eastern olivaceous warbler, Iduna pallida
Western olivaceous warbler, Iduna opaca
Melodious warbler, Hippolais polyglotta
Icterine warbler, Hippolais icterina (A) 
Aquatic warbler, Acrocephalus paludicola
Moustached warbler, Acrocephalus melanopogon (A) 
Sedge warbler, Acrocephalus schoenobaenus
Common reed warbler, Acrocephalus scirpaceus
Great reed warbler, Acrocephalus arundinaceus

Grassbirds and allies
Order: PasseriformesFamily: Locustellidae

Locustellidae are a family of small insectivorous songbirds found mainly in Eurasia, Africa, and the Australian region. They are smallish birds with tails that are usually long and pointed, and tend to be drab brownish or buffy all over.

Savi's warbler, Locustella luscinioides
Common grasshopper-warbler, Locustella naevia

Swallows
Order: PasseriformesFamily: Hirundinidae

The family Hirundinidae is adapted to aerial feeding. They have a slender streamlined body, long pointed wings and a short bill with a wide gape. The feet are adapted to perching rather than walking, and the front toes are partially joined at the base. 

Bank swallow, Riparia riparia
Eurasian crag-martin, Ptyonoprogne rupestris
Rock martin, Ptyonoprogne fuligula
Barn swallow, Hirundo rustica
Red-rumped swallow, Cecropis daurica
Common house-martin, Delichon urbicum

Bulbuls
Order: PasseriformesFamily: Pycnonotidae

Bulbuls are medium-sized songbirds. Some are colourful with yellow, red or orange vents, cheeks, throats or supercilia, but most are drab, with uniform olive-brown to black plumage. Some species have distinct crests. 

Common bulbul, Pycnonotus barbatus

Leaf warblers
Order: PasseriformesFamily: Phylloscopidae

Leaf warblers are a family of small insectivorous birds found mostly in Eurasia and ranging into Wallacea and Africa. The species are of various sizes, often green-plumaged above and yellow below, or more subdued with grayish-green to grayish-brown colors.

Wood warbler, Phylloscopus sibilatrix
Western Bonelli's warbler, Phylloscopus bonelli
Yellow-browed warbler, Phylloscopus inornatus (A)
Willow warbler, Phylloscopus trochilus
Common chiffchaff, Phylloscopus collybita
Iberian chiffchaff, Phylloscopus ibericus

Bush warblers and allies
Order: PasseriformesFamily: Scotocercidae

The members of this family are found throughout Africa, Asia, and Polynesia. Their taxonomy is in flux, and some authorities place some genera in other families.

Scrub warbler, Scotocerca inquieta
Cetti's warbler, Cettia cetti

Sylviid warblers, parrotbills, and allies
Order: PasseriformesFamily: Sylviidae

The family Sylviidae is a group of small insectivorous passerine birds. They mainly occur as breeding species, as the common name implies, in Europe, Asia and, to a lesser extent, Africa. Most are of generally undistinguished appearance, but many have distinctive songs. 

Eurasian blackcap, Sylvia atricapilla
Garden warbler, Sylvia borin
Lesser whitethroat, Curruca curruca (A)
Western Orphean warbler, Curruca hortensis
African desert warbler, Curruca deserti
Tristram's warbler, Curruca deserticola
Sardinian warbler, Curruca melanocephala
Moltoni's warbler, Curruca subalpina
Western subalpine warbler, Curruca iberiae
Eastern subalpine warbler, Curruca cantillans
Greater whitethroat, Curruca communis
Spectacled warbler, Curruca conspicillata
Dartford warbler, Curruca undata (A)

Laughingthrushes and allies
Order: PasseriformesFamily: Leiothrichidae

The members of this family are diverse in size and colouration, though those of genus Turdoides tend to be brown or greyish. The family is found in Africa, India, and southeast Asia.

Fulvous chatterer, Argya fulva

Kinglets
Order: PasseriformesFamily: Regulidae

The kinglets, also called crests, are a small group of birds often included in the Old World warblers, but frequently given family status because they also resemble the titmice.

Common firecrest, Regulus ignicapillus

Starlings
Order: PasseriformesFamily: Sturnidae

Starlings are small to medium-sized passerine birds. Their flight is strong and direct and they are very gregarious. Their preferred habitat is fairly open country. They eat insects and fruit. Plumage is typically dark with a metallic sheen.

European starling, Sturnus vulgaris

Thrushes and allies
Order: PasseriformesFamily: Turdidae

The thrushes are a group of passerine birds that occur mainly in the Old World. They are plump, soft plumaged, small to medium-sized insectivores or sometimes omnivores, often feeding on the ground. Many have attractive songs.

Song thrush, Turdus philomelos
Redwing, Turdus iliacus
Eurasian blackbird, Turdus merula
Fieldfare, Turdus pilaris (A)
Ring ouzel, Turdus torquatus (A)

Old World flycatchers
Order: PasseriformesFamily: Muscicapidae

Old World flycatchers are a large group of small passerine birds native to the Old World. They are mainly small arboreal insectivores. The appearance of these birds is highly varied, but they mostly have weak songs and harsh calls.

Spotted flycatcher, Muscicapa striata
Rufous-tailed scrub-robin, Cercotrichas galactotes
European robin, Erithacus rubecula
Common nightingale, Luscinia megarhynchos
Bluethroat, Luscinia svecica
Red-breasted flycatcher, Ficedula parva (A)
European pied flycatcher, Ficedula hypoleuca
Atlas flycatcher, Ficedula speculigera (A)
Collared flycatcher, Ficedula albicollis (A)
Moussier's redstart, Phoenicurus moussieri
Common redstart, Phoenicurus phoenicurus
Black redstart, Phoenicurus ochruros
Rufous-tailed rock-thrush, Monticola saxatilis
Blue rock-thrush, Monticola solitarius
Whinchat, Saxicola rubetra
European stonechat, Saxicola rubicola
Northern wheatear, Oenanthe oenanthe
Isabelline wheatear, Oenanthe isabellina
Desert wheatear, Oenanthe deserti
Western black-eared wheatear, Oenanthe hispanica
Red-rumped wheatear, Oenanthe moesta
Black wheatear, Oenanthe leucura
White-crowned wheatear, Oenanthe leucopyga
Mourning wheatear, Oenanthe lugens

Old World sparrows
Order: PasseriformesFamily: Passeridae

Old World sparrows are small passerine birds. In general, sparrows tend to be small, plump, brown or grey birds with short tails and short powerful beaks. Sparrows are seed eaters, but they also consume small insects.

House sparrow, Passer domesticus
Spanish sparrow, Passer hispaniolensis
Desert sparrow, Passer simplex
Sudan golden sparrow, Passer luteus (A)

Wagtails and pipits
Order: PasseriformesFamily: Motacillidae

Motacillidae is a family of small passerine birds with medium to long tails. They include the wagtails, longclaws and pipits. They are slender, ground feeding insectivores of open country. 

Gray wagtail, Motacilla cinerea
Western yellow wagtail, Motacilla flava
Citrine wagtail, Motacilla citreola (A)
White wagtail, Motacilla alba
Richard's pipit, Anthus richardi (A)
Tawny pipit, Anthus campestris
Meadow pipit, Anthus pratensis
Tree pipit, Anthus trivialis
Olive-backed pipit, Anthus hodgsoni (A)
Red-throated pipit, Anthus cervinus
Water pipit, Anthus spinoletta (A)
Rock pipit, Anthus petrosus (A)

Finches, euphonias, and allies
Order: PasseriformesFamily: Fringillidae

Finches are seed-eating passerine birds, that are small to moderately large and have a strong beak, usually conical and in some species very large. All have twelve tail feathers and nine primaries. These birds have a bouncing flight with alternating bouts of flapping and gliding on closed wings, and most sing well. 

Common chaffinch, Fringilla coelebs
Trumpeter finch, Bucanetes githaginea
European greenfinch, Chloris chloris
Eurasian linnet, Linaria cannabina
European goldfinch, Carduelis carduelis
European serin, Serinus serinus
Eurasian siskin, Spinus spinus

Old World buntings
Order: PasseriformesFamily: Emberizidae

The emberizids are a large family of passerine birds. They are seed-eating birds with distinctively shaped bills. Many emberizid species have distinctive head patterns.

Corn bunting, Emberiza calandra
Rock bunting, Emberiza cia (A)
Cirl bunting, Emberiza cirlus
Ortolan bunting, Emberiza hortulana
House bunting, Emberiza sahari

See also
List of birds
Lists of birds by region

References

External links
Birds of Western Sahara - World Institute for Conservation and Environment

Western Sahara
 
Birds
Birds
Western Sahara